Acceleration Team Sweden is the Swedish team of Formula Acceleration 1, an international racing series. They are run by the Performance Racing team, owned by Bobby Issazadhe.

History

2014 season 
Drivers: Felix Rosenqvist, Dennis Lind

The team announced Felix Rosenqvist as their driver for the inaugural Formula Acceleration 1 round in Portimao. Due to clashing FIA European Formula Three Championship commitments, Rosenqvist is unable to race at the second round in Navarra, so the Danish driver, Dennis Lind will replace him.

Drivers

Complete Formula Acceleration 1 Results

References 

Sweden
A
Swedish auto racing teams